Marie-Claude Najm (born 6 April 1971) is a Lebanese academic who served as Minister of Justice from 2020 to 2021.

Education and academic career 
Najm studied law at the Saint Joseph University in Beirut and continued her studies at the Paris-Panthéon-Assas University from where she also graduated and later earned her PhD.

She taught at the Faculty of Law and Political Sciences of the Saint Joseph University in Beirut and also in France, where she was a visiting professor at the University Panthéon-Assas (Paris II) and the University Panthéon-Sorbonne (Paris I). She is closely related to the Saint Joseph University, where she is the director of the Center for Legal Studies in the Arab World ("CEDROMA") and Dean of the Faculty of Law as of 2022. 

Her publications focus on conflicts of laws and jurisdictions. In 2007 she was a founding member of the “Khalass!", which aimed at finding a peaceful solution to the political deadlock at the time. She was a supporter of the protests in 2019–2020, again a founding member of a civil protest movement and taught law in the revolutionary tents of the Martyrs' Square in Beirut.

Political career
In January 2020, Najm became the Minister of Justice in the cabinet of Prime Minister Hassan Diab. She was one of the six female ministers in the Diab Government counting 20 ministries, which was viewed as a step in the right direction towards gender equality in Lebanon politics. Najm was the third cabinet minister to step down after the explosions. Her resignation sparked that of the Diab government within hours. Her final act in Diab's government was to commission the Supreme Council of Lebanon, which is the country's top judicial body, to investigate the causes of the disaster, and thereby relieved the public prosecutor Ghassan El Khoury of the task.

Personal life   
She is married to Daniel Kobeh. The couple has a daughter. Najm is a Maronite Christian.

References 

1971 births
Living people
Female justice ministers
Government ministers of Lebanon
Academic staff of Saint Joseph University
Lebanese Maronites
Paris 2 Panthéon-Assas University alumni
Politicians from Beirut
Saint Joseph University alumni
Women government ministers of Lebanon
Justice ministers of Lebanon
Free Patriotic Movement politicians
21st-century Lebanese women politicians
21st-century Lebanese politicians